The 2002-03 AFC Bournemouth season was the club's first season in the English Third Division following relegation the previous year. During the 2002–03 English football season, Bournemouth participated in Division Three, the LDV Vans Trophy, the FA Cup, and the Football League Cup. Bournemouth finished 4th in Division Three and were subsequently promoted via the playoffs. They reached the Fourth Round of the FA Cup, and the Southern Section Semi Final of the LDV Vans Trophy, but were knocked of the League Cup at the first hurdle.

Season squad

Left club during season

Final league table

Competitions

Legend

Third Division

Results

Third Division Playoffs

League Cup

FA Cup

Football League Trophy

References 

A.F.C. Bournemouth
AFC Bournemouth seasons
English football clubs 2002–03 season